The Australian Cricketers' Association (ACA) is an organisation that represents the professional first-class cricketers of Australia, both past and present. It is not a formally registered Trade Union, but an Incorporated Association.

Current administration
Shane Watson is the current president of the ACA. The chair is Greg Dyer, and the remaining members of the Board of Directors are Alyssa Healy, Clea Smith, Kristen Beams, Aaron Finch, Moises Henriques, Lisa Sthalekar, Janet Torney and Pat Cummins.

History
In 2022, ACA expressed their displeasure towards Cricket Australia (CA) due to the understanding or deal between Board of Control for Cricket in India (BCCI) and CA by which the former will pay 10% from the Australian players' IPL salary to CA. Paul Marsh, chief executive of ACA said that their players would oppose this decision by not signing CA, IPL contracts.

References

External links 

Website
ACA Life Members

Cricketers' associations
Sports professional associations
Cricket in Australia
Sports trade unions
Trade unions in Australia
Trade unions established in 1997
1997 establishments in Australia